This is a list of people related to the Democratic Republic of the Congo - Congo (Kinshasa) - the larger of the two Congos, that was also known as Zaire in the 1970s, 80s and 90s.

The list includes non-Congolese people who have had a notable effect on the country during its history.

A separate page contains a List of Democratic Republic of the Congo-related topics.

B 
Dikilu Bageta
Barly Baruti
Christian Bassila
Raymond Ramazani Baya
M'bilia Bel
Jean-Pierre Bemba
Tim Biakabutuka
Mbala Mbuta Biscotte
Pierre Marini Bodho
Bodo (painter)
Omer Bodson
Boyenga Bofala
Ngoy Bomboko
Amba Bongo
Anthony Vanden Borre
José Bosingwa
Tshimen Bwanga

C 
Francis Chansa
Jean Cuvelier

D 
Marie Daulne
Maria de Fonseca
Isabel Maria de Gama
Depara
Larry Devlin
Olive Lembe di Sita
Diblo Dibala
Hassan Djamous

E 
Jirès Kembo Ekoko
King Kester Emeneya
Frédéric Etsou-Nzabi-Bamungwabi

F 
Théophile Mbemba Fundu
André-Philippe Futa

G 
Antoine Ghonda
Gérard Gifuza
Antoine Gizenga

H 
Hissène Habré

I 
Atoki Ileka
Ngasanya Ilongo
Hérita Ilunga
Kasongo Ilunga
Mwepu Ilunga

K 
Maguy Kabamba
Joseph Kabila
Laurent-Désiré Kabila
Jean-Paul Kamudimba Kalala
Pepe Kalle
Albert Kalonji
Christine Kalonji
Dieudonné Kalulika
Jean Collins Musonda Kalusambo
Gérard Kamanda wa Kamanda
Augustin Kambale
Vital Kamerhe
Wadel Abdelkader Kamougué
Loïc Lumbilla Kandja
Trésor Kandol
Stanislas Kanengele-Yondjo
Lokua Kanza
Jean Nguza Karl-i-Bond
Nico Kasanda
Joseph Kasa-Vubu
Mpinga Kasenda
Banyingela Kasonga
Kabwe Kasongo
Ndandu Kasongo
Kaysha
Ya Kid K
Muteba Kidiaba
Gary Kikaya
Évariste Kimba
Simon Kimbangu
Papi Kimoto
Bodys Isek Kingelez
Christian Kinkela
Aksanti Kinonoka
Cyrille Mubiala Kitambala
Paulin Tokala Kombe
Vincent Kompany
Christian Kiwewa
Antoine Kiwewa
Nelly Kiwewa
Blaise Kufo

L 
Goma Lambu
Leki
Ray Lema
Ricardo Lemvo
Eric Lenge
Leroy Lita
Fabrice Lokembo-Lokaso
Vicky Longomba
Ntumba Luaba
Kazenga LuaLua
Lomana LuaLua
Thomas Lubanga
Nono Lubanzadio
Chiguy Lucau
Oscar Kashala Lukumuenda
Roger Lumbala
Guy-Patrice Lumumba
Patrice Lumumba
Trésor Luntala
Jean-Paul Eale Lutula
Péguy Luyindula

M 
Mwadi Mabika
Sifa Mahanya
Yves Ma-Kalambay
Claude Makélélé
Cedric Makiadi
Francois Luambo Makiadi
Calvin Zola Makongo
Ariza Makukula
Félix Malloum
Helene Mambu-ma-Disu
Steve Mandanda
Sam Mangwana
Myra Ndjoku Manianga
Edouard Masengo
Alain Masudi
Franck Matingou
Sita-Taty Matondo
Zola Matumona
Freddy Matungulu
Rio Antonio Mavuba
Jason Mayélé
Michél Mazingu-Dinzey
Kimbembe Mazunga
Nsumbu Mazuwa
Dieudonné Kayembe Mbandakulu
Laurent Mbariko
Marcel Kimemba Mbayo
Lelo Mbele
Didier Ilunga Mbenga
James Dee Kazongo
Joe Mbu
Serge Mputu Mbungu
Mobulu M'Futi
Mutombo Kalombo Léopold
Munga Mibindo
Mutamba Milambo
Kongulu Mobutu
Mobutu Sese Seko
Nzanga Mobutu
Masena Moke
Matt Moussilou
Ritchie Makuma Mpasa
Émile Mpenza
Mbo Mpenza
Merlin Mpiana
Tresor Mputu
Msiri
Fabrice Muamba
V. Y. Mudimbe
Gaby Mudingayi
Salikoko Mufwene
Jose Mukendi
Denis Mukwege
Pierre Mulele
Youssuf Mulumbu
Bijou Kisombe Mundaba
Kiki Musampa
Félix Mwamba Musasa
Kabamba Musasa
Mussasa
Bibey Mutombo
Dikembe Mutombo
Camille Muzinga
Arnold Mvuemba
Jean Bosco Mwenda
Willy Kalombo Mwenze
Alunga Mwepu
Ilunga Mwepu

N 
Kangama Ndiwa
Floribert Ndjabu
Abdoulaye Yerodia Ndombasi
Guylain Ndumbu-Nsungu
Ntema Ndungidi
Marie-Clémentine Anuarite Nengapeta
Floribert N'Galula
Gabriel N'Galula
Eugène Serufuli Ngayabaseka
Arthur Z'ahidi Ngoma
Kisula Ngoy
Bernadette Ngoyisa
Lukeni lua Nimi
Laurent Nkunda
Kavidi Wivine N'Landu
Shabani Nonda
Mayinga N'Seka
Dituabanza Nsumbu
Tcham N'Toya
Antipas Mbusa Nyamwisi
Yannick Nyanga
Nyboma
Hervé Nzelo-Lembi
Charles N'Zogbia
Eugène Diomi Ndongala Nzomambu
Clémentine Nzuji
Olivier Nzuzi

O 
Koffi Olomide
Goukouni Oueddei

P 
Passi

Q

R 
Salim Rambo
Tabu Ley Rochereau
Helen Roseveare
Azarias Ruberwa
Pierre Ryckmans (Congo)

S 
Nyamko Sabuni
Chéri Samba
Christopher Samba
Tonton Semakala

T 
Papy Lukata Shumu
Koloso Sumaili
Pierre Pay-Pay wa Syakasighe
Dikete Tampungu
Tchicaya U Tam'si
Mohammed Tchité
François Tombalbaye
Kabika Tshilolo
Tsholola Tshinyama
Andre Bruno Tshikeva
Étienne Tshisekedi
Moise Tshombe
Cédric Tsimba
Denis Tsoumou
Jeff Tutuana

U

V 
Sheldon B. Vance

W 
Ernest Wamba dia Wamba
Papa Wemba
Emmanuel Weyi

X

Y 
Frederick Kambemba Yamusangie
Mwata Yamvo
Yannick Yenga
Dindo Yogo
Jeanvion Yulu-Matondo

Z 
Gabriel Zakuani

See also 
List of Democratic Republic of the Congo-related topics